Noggin is an American entertainment brand launched on February 2, 1999, as a joint venture between MTV Networks (owners of Nickelodeon) and Sesame Workshop. It started out as a cable television channel and a website, both centered around the concepts of imagination, creativity, and education. Since 2015, Noggin has been a streaming service. The brand previously included multiple programming blocks worldwide.

In Noggin's first three years, the brand was mainly aimed at pre-teens and teenagers. One of Noggin's goals was to "dispel the conventional wisdom that educational programming is not entertaining enough to attract pre-teens and young adults." The channel's schedule was divided into three blocks: one for pre-teens and teens, a morning block for preschoolers, and a nighttime block for reruns of "retro" programs. Noggin made several original shows in its early years: the live-action educational show A Walk in Your Shoes, the short-form puppetry series Oobi, the game show Sponk!, and the variety series Phred on Your Head Show.

In April 2002, the Noggin channel ended its retro block and extended its preschool and teen blocks to last 12 hours each per day. The preschool block aired from 6 a.m. to 6 p.m. daily, and the teen block (now titled "The N") ran from 6 p.m. to 6 a.m. The older-skewing shows that made up Noggin's original tween and teen lineup aired exclusively during The N. Sesame Workshop eventually sold its 50% stake in Noggin in August 2002, but it continued a co-production partnership for Noggin until 2009.

Noggin started out as an experimental brand, and its on-air commercials stressed imagination and thinking through themed short films that were often surreal and abstract. Noggin's creative team looked for "sick and twisted" independent animators to make their on-air presence look unique. After Noggin introduced its daytime block for preschoolers, it was rebranded with a more consistent brand identity, with the more experimental material being confined to The N. The Noggin brand was dormant from 2010 until 2015, when it was announced that Noggin would be returning as a mobile streaming service, which launched on March 5, 2015. Since 2020, the Noggin streaming service has introduced its own exclusive shows.

Brand elements

Logo and branding 

Until 2019, Noggin's brand was defined by its versatile character logo: the bottom half of a smiling face. The upper half of the logo featured various icons that represented a certain topic or idea that the head was "thinking of" (e.g. a beaker to reflect science, flowers to reflect springtime). In the network's early years, hundreds of different "toppers" were designed for the logo, and they were used throughout Noggin's commercials and website. The face in the logo was allowed to wink, show its teeth, and make expressions based on the theme, making it interactive and showing it as a character of itself. Noggin's artists were given a lot of creative freedom for their designs, with one rule being that the toppers should always complement the Noggin face, not outshine or overpower it.

Noggin's logo was featured in a large amount of original shorts and animations that ran between shows on the channel. In its first few years, Noggin's creative team intentionally looked to hire "sick and twisted" independent animators to create station ID commercials, hoping that they could each bring their own personal design elements to the logo. The goal was to make the logo, as well as the channel as a whole, "look unlike any other network."

After Noggin extended its preschool daytime block in 2002, a new set of "topper" designs were introduced, based on traditional children's art such as crayon drawings and paper crafts. In 2019, the original Noggin face logo was replaced for the first time, along with Noggin's former hosts Moose and Zee. The logo was replaced with a lowercase noggin wordmark written in purple, while Moose and Zee were replaced with "more recognizable" characters.

Television channel  

The first service established under Noggin was a cable television channel. It operated from February 2, 1999, until September 28, 2009. During its first few years, the channel mainly showed reruns from Sesame Workshop and Nickelodeon's libraries. Noggin was originally aimed at pre-teens, since Noggin's creative team felt that this age group was "underserved when it comes to new, quality educational television." The Noggin channel was commercial-free and allowed teachers to tape its programs for use in the classroom.

Noggin's original lineup included classic episodes of The Electric Company, 3-2-1 Contact, Cro, Square One Television, and Ghostwriter from Sesame Workshop's library. It also included series like Wild Side Show, Nick News, and Doug from Nickelodeon's library. From 2000 to 2002, Noggin aired reruns of the science show Bill Nye the Science Guy. Bill Nye also starred in brand-new segments made specially for Noggin, where he played the role of Noggin's "head sparkologist" and tried to find out what topics sparked viewers' imaginations.

Noggin's first original show was Phred on Your Head Show, which featured an animated host named Phred. A second original series, A Walk in Your Shoes, premiered in October 1999. Each episode of A Walk in Your Shoes followed two different people "switching lives" to better understand each other's cultures. In 2000, Noggin introduced three series of shorts that aired during program breaks: Me in a Box, which showed kids making dioramas to represent their personalities; Citizen Phoebe, about a girl who wants to run for president; and Oobi, a puppet series that aired during the preschool block.

By 2001, original content made up 40% of Noggin's schedule. That year, Noggin premiered four new shows: Big Kids, a British-American co-production; On the Team, a documentary about a Little League baseball team; Sponk!, a game show centered around improv acting; and The URL with Phred Show, which showcased viewers' submissions to the Noggin website. On April 1, 2002, the channel was reorganized into two blocks: a daytime block for preschoolers and a nighttime block, The N, for teens. Play with Me Sesame, a new series featuring Sesame Street characters, debuted on the same day.

Sesame Workshop continued to co-produce shows for Noggin through 2009, most notably Out There and The Upside Down Show, two live-action series. Both shows were developed by Sesame Workshop's writers in New York and filmed by a multinational team in Australia.

The N 

The N was a nighttime programming block on the Noggin channel, aimed at pre-teens and teenagers. It premiered on April 1, 2002, and aired until December 31, 2007. Promotions advertised the block as "The N: The New Name for Nighttime on Noggin." It took several months for Noggin to choose the right name for the block; as reported by Kidscreen in 2002, they needed a name to "help distance and distinguish the tween programming from the preschool fare," but the legal department also required the block to maintain a relation to Noggin's main name.

Noggin's preexisting tween-targeted shows — like A Walk in Your Shoes and Sponk! — only aired during The N from 2002 onward. Noggin produced several original series for the block, including the animated comedy O'Grady and the drama South of Nowhere. The N was also the U.S. broadcast home of Degrassi: The Next Generation, the latest iteration of the eponymous Canadian teen drama franchise.

Like the rest of Noggin, The N's shows were created with educational goals, which was uncommon for teen programming at the time. The block was managed by the same team that made Noggin's preschool shows; the team considered it a challenge to focus on both preschoolers and an older audience at the same time, but they felt that Noggin and The N had a unified brand identity because both focused on educational shows that taught valuable life lessons. From 2007 to 2009, the block was moved from Noggin to a new channel, which carried TEENick programming throughout the day and relegated The N's content to a block at night. According to Polygon, "Nickelodeon began phasing out The N's programming and replacing it with TEENick, an entertainment block with no educational curriculum and zero involvement from Noggin. The N lost its footing by 2009, and both [The N] and its website closed down completely."

Websites 
The Noggin channel launched along with an interactive website, Noggin.com, which the latter is still active as of 2023. The website features games, blogs, printables, and fact sheets. The website was integrated into many of Noggin's earlier shows, like Sponk! and The URL with Phred Show, which featured viewer-submitted questions and artwork from Noggin.com. In 2001, Noggin launched "Chattervision", which allowed viewers to comment on different shows online and see their conversations appear live on TV. Throughout 2000, Bill Nye of Bill Nye the Science Guy answered questions asked by Noggin.com users between airings of his show.

One of the website's first games was the "Noggimation Station," which taught visitors about the animation process and allowed them to design their own animations, some of which were chosen to air on TV. Another website, called MyNoggin.com, was launched in October 2007. It was a subscription-based site that offered educational games and allowed parents to track their child's progress in different subjects.

Streaming service 
In February 2015, it was announced that Noggin would be relaunched as a mobile streaming service. The app was released on March 5. It includes full episodes of former Noggin shows, as well as some exclusive series and currently-running Nickelodeon series. In May 2015, many shows that had previously been available on Amazon Instant Video were moved to the Noggin app. On November 18, 2015, the app was made available for Android, Apple  and Kindle. On April 8, 2016, Alcatel Mobile announced that the Noggin app would come pre-loaded on its Alcatel Xess tablet.

Two international apps based on Noggin have been launched. In November 2015, a Spanish version of the Noggin app was released in Latin America. It includes some shows unavailable on the English app, such as the Spanish dubs of Roary the Racing Car and Rugrats. The Spanish app had its own Facebook page and a section on the MundoNick website. A Portuguese version was released on November 21, 2015.

On September 21, 2020, it was announced that versions of Noggin would launch in the United Kingdom, France, Germany and Austria as an Amazon Prime Video premium add-on. The UK version of Noggin replaced the existing More Milkshake! service.

In 2020, the Noggin streaming service started to introduce its own exclusive shows. These included an exercise show called Yoga Friends and a cooking show called School of Yum. Kinderwood, an animated series about five classmates at a transforming school building, premiered on Noggin in 2020 and ran for thirty episodes. In 2021, the service introduced a half-hour educational show called Noggin Knows and a series of shorts called The Noggins, which featured new teal-colored mascots called Noggins. It also released a musical podcast called Alpha Beats.

Programming blocks 
TV Land aired a one-night Noggin special on April 26, 1999. Spanning two hours, the special featured reruns of The Electric Company, along with animated shorts featuring the Noggin logo. Noggin shows were also occasionally seen on the main Nickelodeon channel. On June 6, 1999, Nickelodeon ran the first episode of Noggin's Phred on Your Head Show. 

On March 27, 2000, Nickelodeon introduced a half-hour block of Noggin shows that aired every weekday morning until August 2001. The block was originally titled "Noggins Up" and became "Noggin on Nickelodeon" during its second year on the air. It showcased one tween-oriented program every weekday, including A Walk In Your Shoes and On the Team. The block attracted thousands of visitors to the Noggin.com site. Nickelodeon revived the block for a single day on April 7, 2003, to advertise the restructuring of Noggin's lineup. Following the block's removal, premiere episodes of Noggin series were often simulcast on Nickelodeon and Noggin.

The Noggin name was used for an otherwise unrelated programming block on Nick Jr. UK from May 2004 until September 2005. It ran for two hours every night and included reruns of syndicated British television series for children. On January 30, 2006, Noggin was launched as a block on TMF in the United Kingdom, this time in the style of the US Noggin. The channel was available exclusively to Freeview subscribers at the time. It ran every weekday from 7 a.m. to 9 a.m. Noggin continued for a short time on TMF's successor, VIVA, until March 2010.

From May 2021 to March 2022, the Nick Jr. channel aired an hour-long block of programming from the Noggin streaming service every Friday. The block, titled "Noggin Hour," featured shows such as Noggin Knows and Kinderwood, as well as the acquired series Hey Duggee and JoJo & Gran Gran. Noggin interstitials played during commercial breaks, and a purple screen bug reading "On Noggin" was shown toward the beginning of each show.

Other media 
In November 2005, Noggin signed its first merchandising agreement with the online marketplace CafePress. Themed notebooks, cards, mousepads, and clothing were sold on the Noggin website from then until 2009. The shop was created to satisfy parents who had been requesting merchandise since the brand's launch. Angela Leaney, Noggin's senior vice president of brand communications, stated that Noggin had "a huge, loyal following and we could not resist the calls from our audience, for Noggin merchandise, any longer." CafePress co-founder Fred Durham added that Noggin attracted strong interest from his company because of its "dedicated fan base," and that his goal was to share the products "with [Noggin's] millions of fans through quality branded merchandise." Christmas ornaments, which were only sold during the month of December, became the shop's best-selling items of 2005.

History

Creation 
In 1995, Sesame Workshop (then known as the Children's Television Workshop, or "CTW") began planning its own educational cable channel. The Los Angeles Times reported that "launching its own channel is the only way to ensure a home for its highly acclaimed shows, which are often passed over by networks in favor of more commercially successful fare." At first, the channel was to be called "New Kid City" and was planned to be Sesame Workshop's "own niche on the dial with shows that emphasize educational content"; but concept never materialized.

Meanwhile, Nickelodeon (a division of MTV Networks and Viacom) began planning an interactive educational channel called "Big Orange." Other Viacom divisions, such as Viacom Interactive, were involved with the project. After Nickelodeon's president Geraldine Laybourne left in 1996, the "Big Orange" project was put on indefinite hold. By 1997, Nickelodeon retooled the project into Noggin, which was planned to be a television series that met the FCC's requirements for educational programming. A pilot was produced by Nickelodeon, Simon & Schuster, and Paramount Television, based on a series of shorts called Inside Eddie Johnson that emphasized creative thinking. Viacom hoped to grow Noggin into a major brand with educational electronic publishing products, a website, and possibly a cable channel that would focus on educational content, complementing entertainment-oriented Nickelodeon. In March, Nickelodeon revealed they would launch a commercial-free Noggin channel in 1998.

On April 28, 1998, Viacom and Sesame Workshop put together an initial investment of $100 million to start the first strictly educational television channel for children. Both organizations wanted to combine TV and online services to create a "kids' thinking channel," which was named Noggin (a slang term for "head") to reflect its purpose to make kids think, learn, and imagine. Noggin's main goal was to provide educational shows for children aged 6–12. Sesame Workshop initially planned for Noggin to be supported by advertisements like most channels, but later decided that it should debut as a commercial-free network.

To develop ideas for original series, Noggin partnered with schools across the United States to research what would "make fun educational" for grade schoolers. In 1999, Noggin provided each school involved up to $7,100 to run focus groups with students and teachers. The students' opinions and reactions to different activities were recorded and used to improve the content shown on Noggin.

Early history 
On February 2, 1999, the Noggin channel launched to over 1.5 million subscribers via Dish Network. It was marketed as both a satellite television station and a digital network.

Sweepstakes were a major part of Noggin's early advertising. In April 1999, it sponsored a contest in which viewers who submitted the correct lyrics of The Electric Company theme song had a chance to have their electric bills paid for a year. In 2000, Noggin gave out packages of school supplies (called "Noggin's Master of Suspense Kits") to 50,000 U.S. teachers as part of a sweepstakes designed to "celebrate creative, thoughtful educational instruction."

Noggin made an effort to create more interactive programming in 2001, utilizing its website as a way to include viewer participation in many of its shows. It released a tween-oriented game show titled Sponk! in September, which included participation from children online and allowed Noggin.com visitors to chat with the hosts. The URL with Phred Show, which focused on content submitted to Noggin.com from viewers, launched in the same month.

Network repositioning 
In 2001, the Jim Henson Company sold its stake in Noggin to Sesame Workshop along with the rights to Sesame Streets characters. In March 2002, Noggin manager Tom Ascheim announced plans to restructure Noggin's schedule to cater to preschoolers during the day and older children at night. On April 1, 2002, Noggin expanded its preschool and tween blocks to last 12 hours each. The preschool block, also called "the daytime block," lasted from 6 a.m. to 6 p.m. each day. The tween and teen block ran from 6 p.m. to 6 a.m. each night, and it was retitled "The N."

In August 2002, Sesame Workshop sold its 50% share of Noggin to Viacom. The buyout was partially caused by SW's need to pay off debt, in addition to its interest in partnering with other broadcasters. While this limited Sesame Workshop's control over the network's daily operations, it did not affect the company's influence on the programming lineup as Viacom entered a multi-year production deal with Sesame Workshop shortly after the split and continued to broadcast co-produced series (such as Play with Me Sesame). As part of the arrangement, Noggin became the U.S. broadcaster of several shows made by the Workshop without Noggin's involvement, such as Tiny Planets and Pinky Dinky Doo.

Following the split, creative executives from Noggin toured New York schools in search of ways to improve the channel's programming and continuity. Amy Friedman, senior vice president of development at Noggin, decided to model the channel after a well-run preschool. These ideas took effect in April 2003, when Noggin's slogan was changed to "It's Like Preschool on TV." The changes also included revised branding and a new lineup, divided into thematic blocks based on key curricular knowledge. On December 31, 2003, a Nielsen Media Research report confirmed that the redesigned Noggin channel was available in 37.1 million households.

The Noggin brand was placed on hiatus from 2009 until 2015. The original Noggin cable channel was replaced by a 24-hour channel based on Nickelodeon's long-running Nick Jr. block. The N, on the other hand, would be merged with Nickelodeon's TEENick block to form a standalone channel aimed at teenagers, known as TeenNick. On January 29, 2015, Viacom CEO Philippe Dauman confirmed that the Noggin brand would be revived as a mobile streaming service.

Modern history 
The Noggin streaming service received mixed reviews when it was released in 2015. Brad Tuttle of Time predicted that paying $6 a month for a streaming app with much less content than Netflix would not be a popular idea with parents. Scott Porch of Wired felt that the Noggin app helped Viacom decrease its dependence on cable channels, but noticed that it was only "baby steps toward the no-cable-required model." Amanda Bindel of Common Sense complimented the user-friendly layout and educational content, but felt that it needed more parental controls. In fall 2015, the app received a Parents' Choice Award in the category.

On May 10, 2019, Viacom announced that the Noggin app had reached 2.5 million subscribers and that it would receive a major upgrade. In June 2019, Nickelodeon unveiled a new Noggin logo, which was used on the redesigned Noggin website and app.

Live events 

Noggin held live events to promote its shows. At the 2001 North American Trade Show in Minnesota, Noggin presented a replica of the set from Oobi. In spring 2002, Noggin launched a live version of its Play with Me Sesame series, featuring mascot characters and music from the show. In May 2002, the Jillian's restaurant chain offered "Noggin Play Days" each Wednesday afternoon, where attendees could watch a live feed of Noggin with themed activities and meals.

In March 2004, Noggin partnered with GGP shopping malls to host a free educational program called Club Noggin. It debuted at five test malls in April of the same year. Attendance at the first few events exceeded expectations, leading GGP to bring Club Noggin to over 100 malls across the United States. The monthly events were hosted by trained YMCA leaders, who gave out Noggin posters and merchandise to attendees. Each meeting was themed around a different Noggin character and encouraged visitors to create art projects based on the character. Donovan Patton of Blue's Clues made appearances at Club Noggin in July 2006 to promote his show's tenth anniversary. In 2005, Club Noggin received a Silver Community Relations Award in the International Council of Shopping Centers' MAXI Competition.

In August 2005, Noggin and Highland Capital Partners produced "Jamarama Live", a music festival that toured the United States. It began in October and continued until late 2006. Laurie Berkner, a musician on Jack's Big Music Show, performed at many Jamarama venues on the East Coast. The festival also included meet-and-greet opportunities with a mascot costume of Moose A. Moose. The characters hosted karaoke, face-painting, and storytelling sessions during intermissions. Reviewers for Time Magazine compared Jamarama to a family-friendly version of Lollapalooza. Jamarama proved more popular than other children's stage shows running at the time, such as those featuring Mickey Mouse. Noggin executives considered on-air advertisements a major contributor to the event's success. After the tour ended, a DVD set including Jamarama performances was released.

In November 2005, a Noggin float appeared at America's Thanksgiving Parade. In November 2006, Noggin hosted an online charity auction on its website, called the "Noggin Auction." Viewers could bid on props from different Noggin shows. In August 2007, Noggin partnered with St. Jude Children's Research Hospital and sponsored its annual Trike-A-Thon program.

See also 
 List of programs broadcast by Noggin

References

External links 
 

1999 establishments in New York (state)
Children's television networks in the United States
Entertainment companies based in New York City
Television channels and stations established in 1999
Internet television channels
Internet television streaming services
Subscription video on demand services
Nickelodeon
Sesame Workshop
Paramount Streaming
The Jim Henson Company
Webby Award winners